MensEGG was a style magazine distributed in Japan aimed at young men published between 1999 and 2013. It was a counterpart of Egg magazine, which focused on Gyaru-oh (male Gyaru) fashions – it was the gyaru-oh bible. There is also Men's Egg Bitter magazine, aimed at Gyaruo aged 23 and above.

History and profile
Men's Egg''' was established in 1999. The image of the magazine revolved around Japanese working-class trends, appealing to young men mostly under 20. It draws inspiration from Japanese "yankee" (delinquent) culture, also with techno and surfer influences. This style is often looked down on by some other Japanese, who associate it with juvenile delinquency, and also, "Inakamono"(somebody from the countryside). The generic "Bon-Jovi"-esque style featured in Men's Egg magazine can be found being offered cheaply in chain clothing-stores across Japan such as "Zenmall" or "Jeansmate" although the big name gyaruo fashion brands sell for high prices.

Apart from fashion, the magazine also featured information for young teenagers, such as advice on picking up girls, dating, and explicit articles with advice on sex. The magazine also contained information about club events.Men's Egg'' ceased publication in October 2013.

References

1999 establishments in Japan
2013 disestablishments in Japan
Defunct magazines published in Japan
Fashion magazines published in Japan
Gyaru
Magazines established in 1999
Magazines disestablished in 2013
Monthly magazines published in Japan
Men's fashion magazines
Men's magazines published in Japan